Jakub Vesely (born ) is a retired Czech male volleyball player. He was part of the Czech Republic men's national volleyball team at the 2010 FIVB Volleyball Men's World Championship in Italy. He played for Arago de Sette.

Clubs
 Arago de Sette (2010)

References

1986 births
Living people
Czech men's volleyball players
Place of birth missing (living people)